Aurel Mitterdorfer, professionally known as Rel Hunt, is an Australian actor who played Angus in Macbeth, an updated modern version of the Shakespeare play and portrayed Al Corley in the fictionalized 2005 American television movie/docudrama Dynasty: The Making of a Guilty Pleasure, based on the creation and behind the scenes production of the 1980s prime time soap opera Dynasty. He also played a bag thief in one episode of Home and Away (1993), Ben Murphy in one episode of Blue Heelers (1994), Butch Yunkin in The Stalking of Laurie Show (2000) and Ryan Scheppers in Seasons 5-7 of Heartbreak High. He also voiced Frankie in the Static Shock episode "Pop's Girlfriend".

Hunt starred in Underbelly: Razor playing William Archer - Razor man and Crown Street bath house proprietor.

Hunt is apart of the rugby league back to back premiership winning team, Eastern Suburbs Wombats. He is a well liked team member and loves penguin slide.

References

External links

Male actors from Sydney
Living people
1974 births